Igor Filippov may refer to:

 Igor Filippov (volleyball) (born 1991), Russian volleyball player
 Igor Filippov (painter) (born 1961), Ukrainian painter